The John Brown Watson Memorial Library Building is a historic library building on the campus of the University of Arkansas at Pine Bluff in Pine Bluff, Arkansas.  It is a two-story Art Deco building, faced in cream colored brick.  It was built in 1938–39 with funding support from the Public Works Administration, and was the first library building on the campus.  It underwent a major restoration in 2000–2003, and now serves as the university museum.

See also
National Register of Historic Places listings in Jefferson County, Arkansas

References

Art Deco architecture in Arkansas
Buildings and structures in Pine Bluff, Arkansas
National Register of Historic Places in Pine Bluff, Arkansas